Jiang Tao (born 28 June 1989) is a Chinese former footballer who played as a defender.

Club career
Jiang Tao would play for Beijing Guoan's youth team before he was loaned out to the clubs satellite team called Beijing Guoan Talent, which would play as a foreign team in Singapore's S.League in 2010. He made his senior debut in a 2–1 home defeat against Singapore Armed Forces FC on 23 June 2010. This would be followed by his first goal on 22 July 2010 in a 3-1 victory against Étoile FC in the league. Upon his return from his loan period he would be promoted to Beijing Guoan's senior team, however despite several appearances on the clubs substitutes bench he could not find any playing time on the field and during the 2013 league season he was loaned to third-tier club Meizhou Hakka to gain some playing time.

At the beginning of the 2014 league season Jiang Tao was released from his parent club. He would not find another team to play for until he joined second-tier club Qingdao Huanghai at the beginning of the 2015 league season. At Qingdao he would revive his career and establish himself as a vital member in the team's defence as the club narrowly missed out on winning the 2016 division championship on goal difference. His performances would attract the interests of top tier clubs especially Beijing Guoan who he rejoined at the beginning of the 2017 league season.

On 13 July 2021, he returned to Beijing Guoan.

Career statistics
.

Honours

Club
Beijing Guoan
Chinese FA Cup: 2018

References

External links
 

1989 births
Living people
Sportspeople from Zibo
Chinese footballers
Footballers from Shandong
Beijing Guoan F.C. players
Qingdao F.C. players
Meizhou Hakka F.C. players
Chinese Super League players
China League One players
China League Two players
Singapore Premier League players
Association football defenders